The 2014 Women's U23 African Volleyball Championship was the 1st edition of the Women's U23 African Volleyball Championship, it was held 7 to 9 September 2014 in Algiers, Algeria. It was the inaugural edition of the tournament. The tournament was organized by the African Volleyball Confederation, in association with Algerian Volleyball Federation.

The tournament served as the African qualifiers for the 2015 FIVB Volleyball Women's U23 World Championship held in Ankara, Turkey which the winner team qualified for the world championship. Egypt won the tournament.

Participated teams

Venue

Final group

|}

|}

Final standing

Awards

Most Valuable Player
 Jihen Mohamed
Best Outside Spikers
 Celia Bourihane
Best Setter
 Nihel Kebaier
Best Receiver
 Nihel Ahmed

Best Server
 Celia Bourihane
Best Middle Blockers
 Sarrah Hanafy
Best Libero
 Fatima Ktari

See also
2014 Men's U23 African Volleyball Championship

References

External links
Championnat d'Afrique des Nations U23 U18 Dames - Results - afvb.org

2014 in women's volleyball
2014 in Algerian sport
Volleyball in Algeria
International volleyball competitions hosted by Algeria